Amaurobioides is a genus of anyphaenid sac spiders first described by O. Pickard-Cambridge in 1883.

Species
 it contains twelve species:
Amaurobioides africana Hewitt, 1917 – Namibia, South Africa
Amaurobioides chilensis (Nicolet, 1849) – Chile
Amaurobioides isolata Hirst, 1993 – Australia (South Australia)
Amaurobioides litoralis Hickman, 1949 – Australia (Tasmania)
Amaurobioides major Forster, 1970 – New Zealand
Amaurobioides maritima O. Pickard-Cambridge, 1883 – New Zealand
Amaurobioides minor Forster, 1970 – New Zealand
Amaurobioides pallida Forster, 1970 – New Zealand
Amaurobioides picuna Forster, 1970 – New Zealand
Amaurobioides piscator Hogg, 1909 – New Zealand (Auckland Is., Campbell Is.)
Amaurobioides pleta Forster, 1970 – New Zealand
Amaurobioides pohara Forster, 1970 – New Zealand

References

Anyphaenidae
Araneomorphae genera
Cosmopolitan spiders